

Offseason 
 October 24, 1979: Paul Reuschel was released by the Indians.
 January 4, 1980: David Clyde and Jim Norris were traded by the Indians to the Texas Rangers for Gary Gray and Mike Bucci (minors).
 February 15, 1980: Jerry Mumphrey was traded by the Indians to the San Diego Padres for Bob Owchinko and Jim Wilhelm.

Regular season 
"Super Joe" Charboneau made his debut with the Indians in 1980, splitting time between left field and designated hitter. His 23 home runs led the team and he captured the city's imagination with his hard hitting and his eccentricities. His tendency to dye his hair unnatural colors, open beer bottles with his eye socket, and drink beer with a straw through his nose, and other stories that emerged about how he did his own dental work and fixed a broken nose with a pair of pliers and a few shots of Jack Daniel's whiskey, stood out in 1980. By mid-season, Charboneau was the subject of a song--"Go Joe Charboneau"—that reached #3 on the local charts.

He finished the season with 87 runs batted in and a .289 batting average while winning the American League Rookie of the Year award—all in spite of being stabbed with a ball-point pen by a crazed fan as he waited for the team bus on March 8. The pen penetrated an inch and hit a rib, but Charboneau played his first regular-season game just over a month later, on April 11. He missed the final six weeks of the season with a pelvis injury. He would never play another full season in the majors after 1980.

Season standings

Record vs. opponents

Notable transactions 
 June 3, 1980: 1980 Major League Baseball Draft
Kelly Gruber was drafted by the Indians in the 1st round (10th pick). Player signed June 8, 1980.
Doug Drabek was drafted by the Indians in the 4th round, but did not sign.
Mike Jeffcoat was drafted in the 13th round of the 1980 amateur draft.

Opening Day Lineup

Roster

Player stats

Batting
Note: G = Games played; AB = At bats; R = Runs scored; H = Hits; 2B = Doubles; 3B = Triples; HR = Home runs; RBI = Runs batted in; AVG = Batting average; SB = Stolen bases

Pitching
Note: W = Wins; L = Losses; ERA = Earned run average; G = Games pitched; GS = Games started; SV = Saves; IP = Innings pitched; R = Runs allowed; ER = Earned runs allowed; BB = Walks allowed; K = Strikeouts

Awards and honors 
 Joe Charboneau, American League Rookie of the Year
All-Star Game

Farm system 

LEAGUE CHAMPIONS: Waterloo

Notes

References 
1980 Cleveland Indians team page at Baseball Reference
1980 Cleveland Indians team page at www.baseball-almanac.com

Cleveland Guardians seasons
Cleveland Indians season
Cleve